Nicolas de Grigny (baptized 8 September 1672 – November 30, 1703) was a French organist and composer. He died young and left behind a single collection of organ music, and an Ouverture for harpsichord.

Life

Nicolas de Grigny was born in Reims in the parish of Saint-Pierre-Le-Vieil. The exact date of his birth is unknown; he was baptized on September 8. He was born into a family of musicians: his father, his grandfather, and his uncle, Robert, were organists at the Reims Cathedral, the Basilica of St. Pierre and St. Hilaire, respectively. Few details about his life are known, nothing at all about his formative years. Between 1693 and 1695 he served as organist of the abbey church of Saint Denis, in Paris (where his brother André de Grigny was sub-prior). It was also during that period that Grigny studied with Nicolas Lebègue, who was by then one of the most famous French keyboard composers. In 1695 Grigny married Marie-Magdeleine de France, daughter of a Parisian merchant. Apparently he returned to his hometown soon afterwards: the record of the birth of his first son indicates that de Grigny was already in Reims in 1696. The couple went on to produce six more children.

By late 1697, Grigny was appointed titular organist of Notre-Dame de Reims (the exact date of the appointment is not known), the city's famous cathedral in which French kings were crowned. In 1699 the composer published his Premier livre d'orgue [contenant une messe et les hymnes des principalles festes de l'année] in Paris. Grigny died prematurely in 1703, aged 31, shortly after accepting a job offer from Saint Symphorien, a parish church in Reims. His Livre d'orgue was reissued in 1711 through the efforts of his widow. The collection became known abroad: it was copied in 1713 by Johann Sebastian Bach, and later by Johann Gottfried Walther.

Work

Nicolas de Grigny's only surviving music is a large volume of organ works, Premier livre d'orgue (Paris, 1699; second edition 1711). The second edition was the only one known until 1949, when the earlier print was discovered—a single surviving copy at Bibliothèque nationale de France. This was published by Christophe Ballard using the original plates prepared by Claude Roussel, its engraver, in 1699. The first modern edition, by Alexandre Guilmant, 1904, was based on the 1711 version.

Unlike many other French livres d'orgue of the time, Grigny's publication contains no preface.
The collection is in two parts: the first is a mass setting, the second comprises settings of five hymns for the principal feasts of the church year: Veni Creator (5 versets), Pange lingua (3 versets), Verbum supernum (4 versets), Ave maris stella (4 versets) and A solus ortus (three versets). There are 42 pieces overall. The plan of the mass is as follows: 
 5 Kyrie versets, 
 9 Gloria versets, 
 an Offertory, 
 2 Sanctus versets, 
 1 Benedictus verset, 
 an Elévation, 
 2 Agnus Dei versets, 
 a Communion, and
 an Ite Missa Est verset.

As specified by the Caeremoniale Parisiensis (1662), Grigny states the chant melodies in the first and last Kyrie, Gloria, and the first Sanctus and Agnus Dei. His publication is based on Cunctipotens genitor Deus. The collection also includes a Point d'orgue, a piece based on a long pedal point.

See also
 French organ school

Notes

References
 Apel, Willi. 1972. The History of Keyboard Music to 1700. Translated by Hans Tischler. Indiana University Press, 1972. . Originally published as Geschichte der Orgel- und Klaviermusik bis 1700 by Bärenreiter-Verlag, Kassel.
 
 Halbreich, Harry. Liner notes to: Nicolas de Grigny - Premier livre d'orgue, Michel Chapuis (organist). 1976/1987, Auvidis-Astrée E 7725.
 
 
 
 
 Silbiger, Alexander. 2004. Keyboard Music Before 1700 (in: Routledge Studies in Musical Genres). ,

External links

Biography
 Biographie à Musicologie.org Biography and extended bibliography 
 Medieval.org: Grigny: Hymns Includes partial discography and miscellaneous details about the composer

Scores
 
Free scores at the Mutopia Project
Premier Livre d'Orgue; ed. J Baxendale (Tynset, Lyrebird Music, 2020).

Audio
 Listen to pieces from A solis ortus in the Premier Livre d'Orgue:
 Plein jeu
 Trio
 Point d'orgue sur les grands jeux
  François-Henri Clicquot organ from Souvigny

1672 births
1703 deaths
18th-century classical composers
18th-century keyboardists
Composers for pipe organ
French Baroque composers
French classical organists
French male classical composers
French male organists
Musicians from Reims
17th-century male musicians
Male classical organists